Spectrum Health System, commonly known as Spectrum Health, is a not-for-profit, integrated, managed care health care organization based in West Michigan.

Spectrum Health's subsidiaries include hospitals, treatment facilities, urgent care facilities, as well as physician practices that serve the western Michigan area. Priority Health is a subsidiary health plan with one million members. Spectrum Health is the largest employer in West Michigan with 31,000 staff, 4,200 physicians and advanced practice providers, including 1,600 members of the Spectrum Health Medical Group, and 3,200 volunteers.

In 2012, Spectrum Health System was recognized as one of the Top 50 Integrated Health Care Networks in the United States by IMS Health.

History
Spectrum Health was formally incorporated on September 19, 1997, after a high-profile legal battle, combining Butterworth Health System and Blodgett Memorial Medical Center, making it the largest health care organization in West Michigan. In August 2000, Richard C. Breon was hired to lead the organization as CEO, and sought to form an integrated health care system.

In July 2018, Tina Freese-Decker was named CEO to succeed Richard Breon.

In October 2018 Spectrum closed on a merger with Lakeland Health, a health system in southwest Michigan consisting of 3 hospitals, 450 providers, and 4,000 employees. Integration has begun and is underway. Spectrum Health Lakeland will operate as a wholly owned subsidiary of Spectrum Health and will uniquely have two governing boards.

In June 2021, Spectrum Health announced plans to merge with Beaumont Health.  In 2022 Beaumont and Spectrum announced their merger was effective on February 1, 2022, because the federal government determined this would not violate antitrust regulations. The new system is called BHSH Health, a temporary name, with Spectrum Health CEO Tina Freese Decker as the head and with both existing headquarters operating.

Services
Spectrum Health provides inpatient and outpatient services at a variety of locations throughout Michigan.

Hospitals
Spectrum has facilities in numerous communities in western Michigan:
 Spectrum Health Helen DeVos Children's Hospital, Grand Rapids
 Spectrum Health Meijer Heart Center, Grand Rapids
 Spectrum Health Butterworth Hospital, Grand Rapids
 Spectrum Health Blodgett Hospital, East Grand Rapids
 Spectrum Health Gerber Memorial, Fremont
 Spectrum Health Kelsey Hospital, Lakeview
 Spectrum Health Reed City Hospital, Reed City
 Spectrum Health United Hospital, Greenville
 Spectrum Health Zeeland Community Hospital, Zeeland
 Spectrum Health Ludington Hospital, Ludington
 Spectrum Health Big Rapids Hospital, Big Rapids
 Spectrum Health Pennock, Hastings
 Spectrum Health Lakeland, St. Joseph
 Spectrum Health Lakeland, Niles
 Spectrum Health Lakeland, Watervliet

Other facilities and services
Spectrum Health Continuing Care is West Michigan's largest provider of post-acute services, including rehabilitative, long-term acute, home and residential care.  Spectrum Health has an air ambulance helicopter service, called Aeromed, that transports patients between accident scenes as well as between hospitals and the airport.
Spectrum Health Visiting Nurses Association provides home care services in the West Michigan area.

As of 2019 the organization has leased space in 26 places to house administrative employees. In 2019 it announced it would centralize its staff, totaling 1,200, into a single building in Downtown Grand Rapids. The plans call for it to have eight stories. The organization plans to spend $100 million. The Downtown Development Authority (DDA) of Grand Rapids approved Spectrum's plan in October 2021.

Awards and recognition
As a system, Spectrum Health has earned hundreds of awards.  Recent awards include:
 Spectrum Health was named one of the nation's 15 Top Health Systems—and in the top five among the largest health systems—by Michigan-based Truven Health Analytics for 2017. This is the sixth time the organization has received this recognition from Truven.
 HealthGrades Joint Replacement Excellence Award
 Top 100 Integrated Health Care Networks
 HealthGrades Distinguished Hospital Award for Clinical Excellence
 HealthGrades Joint Replacement Excellence Award
 HealthGrades Cardiac Care Excellence Award
 HealthGrades Cardiac Surgery Excellence Awards
 HealthGrades Pulmonary Care Excellence Award

The system has also been rated Aa3 by Moody's Investors Service, placing it among only 40 health care systems in the country to receive this high rating.

External links
 Spectrum Health System website
 Priority Health website
 Spectrum Health Beat website

References

Hospital networks in the United States
Organizations based in Grand Rapids, Michigan
Medical and health organizations based in Michigan